Rhododendron maddenii (隐脉杜鹃) is a rhododendron species native to Bhutan, northern India, northeast Myanmar, Sikkim, Thailand, northern Vietnam, and southwestern China, where it grows at altitudes of . The flowers are predominantly white, very fragrant, and unusually produced during May and June. However, it dislikes freezing temperatures (RHS H3), and is more likely to thrive in warm or coastal temperate climates such as Cornwall, UK.

References

 "Rhododendron maddenii", J. D. Hooker, Rhododendr. Sikkim-Himalaya. 2: t. 18. 1851.
 The Plant List
 Flora of China
 Hirsutum.com

maddenii